Shalu may refer to:

Shalu (sari), regional variant of the sari from Banaras (Varanasi), India
Shalu Monastery, or Ṣalu Monastery, in Shigatse, Tibet
Shalu District, district in Taichung, Taiwan
Shalu railway station, railway station of Taiwan Railways Administration